Creston is a city in and the county seat of Union County, Iowa. The population was 7,536 at the time of the 2020 Census.

History

Creston was originally settled in 1868 as a survey camp for the Burlington and Missouri Railroad. It was named for the fact that it was on the crest of the railroad line between the Missouri and Mississippi river basins. The area was developed largely for agriculture, with related industries accompanying it. Creston had a flour mill in the early decades of the 20th century. The town was officially established in 1869 and incorporated in 1871.

Creston was chosen as the division point for the railroad, who built machine shops, a roundhouse, and a construction camp in the new town. Railroad employees, including African Americans, were recruited from Chicago and other major cities to work in Creston. The Chicago, Burlington and Quincy Railroad (CB&Q) opened a new station in Creston in 1899. The three-story, yellow brick Creston station is in the French Provincial style, with a red-tiled mansard roof.

Creston's economy and population were affected during the mid-20th century by a reduction in passenger train service and decline in railroad employment. The old machine shop building was destroyed by a tornado in 1946 and the remainder of the roundhouse burned down in 1981. The CB&Q station served passengers for 69 years before being renovated in 1978 to serve as city hall.

The railroad, now BNSF Railway, continues to be a major hauler of grain and coal in the region and uses Creston as a crew change point: Creston-based crews operate trains between Creston and Lincoln, Nebraska, while crews from Galesburg, Illinois and Lincoln stay in Creston before returning home.

Creston is served by Amtrak's daily Chicago–San Francisco Bay Area California Zephyr. Amtrak has used Creston's historic CB&Q station since 2019.

2012 tornado

Creston was hit by an EF2 tornado on April 14, 2012. The tornado caused considerable damage to the hospital, community college, Kingdom Hall of Jehovah's Witnesses, and the high school. The town's tornado sirens did not sound, catching people off guard. Patients at the hospital were transferred to other local hospitals. The college suffered roof and window damage to its dorms and students were transferred to local hotels for the rest of the school semester. Fourteen people suffered minor injuries; there were no deaths. The Greater Regional Medical Center was two weeks from an open house to unveil a major renovation when it was severely damaged by the tornado. One year after the tornado and $10 million in renovations later, the hospital was fully restored.

Geography

McKinley Lake lies within a large, multi-purpose municipal park within the city limits, and three additional recreational lakes are located within seven miles of Creston: Green Valley State Park, Summit Lake, Twelve Mile Lake and Three Mile Recreation Area.

Climate

According to the Köppen Climate Classification system, Creston has a hot-summer humid continental climate, abbreviated "Dfa" on climate maps.

Demographics

2010 census
As of the census of 2010, there were 7,834 people, 3,378 households, and 1,973 families living in the city. The racial makeup of the city was 96.0% White, 1.0% African American, 0.3% Native American, 0.6% Asian, 0.8% from other races, and 1.2% from two or more races. Hispanic or Latino of any race were 2.3% of the population.

There were 3,378 households, of which 28.1% had children under the age of 18 living with them, 42.5% were married couples living together, 11.5% had a female householder with no husband present, 4.4% had a male householder with no wife present, and 41.6% were non-families. 35.7% of all households were made up of individuals, and 15.3% had someone living alone who was 65 years of age or older. The average household size was 2.23 and the average family size was 2.87.

The median age in the city was 38.8 years. 23.1% of residents were under the age of 18; 10.5% were between the ages of 18 and 24; 22.9% were from 25 to 44; 25.5% were from 45 to 64; and 17.9% were 65 years of age or older. The gender makeup of the city was 47.7% male and 52.3% female.

2000 census
As of the census of 2000, there were 7,597 people, 3,346 households, and 1,974 families living in the city. The racial makeup of the city was 98.13% White, 0.34% African American, 0.22% Native American, 0.34% Asian, 0.38% from other races, and 0.58% from two or more races. Hispanic or Latino of any race were 1.26% of the population.

There were 3,346 households, out of which 26.4% had children under the age of 18 living with them, 46.5% were married couples living together, 9.9% had a female householder with no husband present, and 41.0% were non-families. 35.7% of all households were made up of individuals, and 16.0% had someone living alone who was 65 years of age or older. The average household size was 2.20 and the average family size was 2.86.

Age spread: 22.6% under the age of 18, 10.4% from 18 to 24, 25.0% from 25 to 44, 22.0% from 45 to 64, and 20.0% who were 65 years of age or older. The median age was 39 years. For every 100 females, there were 86.7 males. For every 100 females age 18 and over, there were 83.3 males.

The median income for a household in the city was $29,831, and the median income for a family was $41,003. Males had a median income of $27,580 versus $20,172 for females. The per capita income for the city was $16,411. About 7.0% of families and 11.5% of the population were below the poverty line, including 13.6% of those under age 18 and 8.3% of those age 65 or over.

Education
Creston is served by the Creston Community School District:
 Creston High School
 Creston Middle School
 Creston Elementary School

Private Schools in Creston include:
 St. Malachy School (K-8) of the Roman Catholic Diocese of Des Moines
 Mayflower Heritage Christian Academy (K-8)

Colleges
 Southwestern Community College
 Buena Vista University – Creston Campus

Notable people

Harry Archer, Broadway composer and bandleader
William Bell, tubist
Julee Cruise, actor and singer
Walter Cunningham (1932–2023) astronaut on the Apollo 7 mission
Sherry Edmundson Fry, sculptor and co-founder of the American Army Camouflage Corps
Dick Wick Hall, writer and humorist
Jerry Harrington, Major League Baseball player
Bob Hawk, radio personality
Jerome C. Hunsaker (1886–1984), designer of flying boats and airships
James M. McCoy, 6th Chief Master Sergeant of the United States Air Force.
Edward E. Miller, U.S. representative from Illinois
Frosty Peters, American football player
Frank Phillips, founder of the Phillips Petroleum Company
John Robinson (born 1954), one of the most recorded drummers in history
Ray Sorensen, member of the Iowa House of Representatives
Phyllis Thede (born 1954), lived here as a child; since 2009 she has served as an Iowa state representative
Marcia Wallace (1942–2013), actress
Kiersten Warren, actress

References

External links

 
Creston City Website
Creston Iowa Information

 
Cities in Iowa
Cities in Union County, Iowa
County seats in Iowa
Populated places established in 1868
1868 establishments in Iowa